Operation Paperclip was a secret United States intelligence program in which more than 1,600 German scientists, engineers, and technicians were taken from the former Nazi Germany to the U.S. for government employment after the end of World War II in Europe, between 1945 and 1959. Conducted by the Joint Intelligence Objectives Agency (JIOA), it was largely carried out by special agents of the U.S. Army's Counterintelligence Corps (CIC). Many of these personnel were former members and some were former leaders of the Nazi Party.

In February 1945, Supreme Headquarters Allied Expeditionary Force (SHAEF) set up T-Force, or Special Sections Subdivision, which grew to over 2,000 personnel by June. T-Force examined 5,000 German targets with a high priority on synthetic rubber and oil catalysts, new designs in armored equipment, V-2 (rocket) weapons, jet and rocket propelled aircraft, naval equipment, field radios, secret writing chemicals, aero medicine research, gliders, and "scientific and industrial personalities”.

When large numbers of German scientists began to be discovered in late April, Special Sections Subdivision set up the Enemy Personnel Exploitation Section to manage and interrogate them. The Enemy Personnel Exploitation Section established a detention center, DUSTBIN, first in Paris and later in Kransberg Castle outside Frankfurt. The U.S. Joint Chiefs of Staff (JCS) established the first secret recruitment program, called Operation Overcast, on July 20, 1945, initially "to assist in shortening the Japanese war and to aid our postwar military research". The term "Overcast" was the name first given by the German scientists' family members for the housing camp where they were held in Bavaria. In late summer 1945, the JCS established the JIOA, a subcommittee of the Joint Intelligence Community, to directly oversee Operation Overcast and later Operation Paperclip. The JIOA representatives included the army's director of intelligence, the chief of naval intelligence, the assistant chief of Air Staff-2 (air force intelligence), and a representative from the State Department. In November 1945, Operation Overcast was renamed Operation Paperclip by Ordnance Corps officers, who would attach a paperclip to the folders of those rocket experts whom they wished to employ in the United States.

The primary purpose for Operation Paperclip was U.S. military advantage in the Soviet–American Cold War and the Space Race. The Soviet Union responded by relocating more than 2,200 German specialists—a total of more than 6,000 people including family members—with Operation Osoaviakhim during one night on October 22, 1946.

In a secret directive circulated on September 3, 1946, President Truman officially approved Operation Paperclip and expanded it to include 1,000 German scientists under "temporary, limited military custody".

Osenberg List
In the later part of World War II, Germany was at a logistical disadvantage, having failed to conquer the USSR with Operation Barbarossa (June–December 1941), and its drive for the Caucasus (June 1942–February 1943). The failed conquest had depleted German resources, and its military–industrial complex was unprepared to defend the Greater Germanic Reich against the Red Army's westward counterattack. By early 1943, the German government began recalling from combat a number of scientists, engineers, and technicians; they returned to work in research and development to bolster German defense for a protracted war with the USSR. The recall from frontline combat included 4,000 rocketeers returned to Peenemünde, in northeast coastal Germany.

The Nazi government's recall of their now-useful intellectuals for scientific work first required identifying and locating the scientists, engineers, and technicians, then ascertaining their political and ideological reliability. , the engineer-scientist heading the Wehrforschungsgemeinschaft (Defense Research Association), recorded the names of the politically cleared men to the Osenberg List, thus reinstating them to scientific work.

In March 1945, at Bonn University, a Polish laboratory technician found pieces of the Osenberg List stuffed in a toilet; the list subsequently reached MI6, who transmitted it to U.S. intelligence. Then U.S. Army Major Robert B. Staver, Chief of the Jet Propulsion Section of the Research and Intelligence Branch of the United States Army Ordnance Corps, used the Osenberg List to compile his list of German scientists to be captured and interrogated; Wernher von Braun, Germany's premier rocket scientist, headed Major Staver's list.

Identification

In Operation Overcast, Major Staver's original intent was only to interview the scientists, but what he learned changed the operation's purpose. On May 22, 1945, he transmitted to the U.S. Department of War Colonel Joel Holmes' telegram urging the evacuation to America of 100 of the 400 German scientists in his custody, as most "important for [the] Pacific war" effort. Most of the Osenberg List engineers worked at the Baltic coast German Army Research Center Peenemünde, developing the V-2 rocket. After capturing them, the Allies initially housed them and their families in Landshut, Bavaria, in southern Germany.

Beginning on July 19, 1945, the U.S. Joint Chiefs managed the captured ARC rocketeers under Operation Overcast. However, when the "Camp Overcast" name of the scientists' quarters became locally known, the program was renamed Operation Paperclip in November 1945. Despite these attempts at secrecy, the press interviewed several of the scientists later that year.

Capture and detention

Early on, the United States created the Combined Intelligence Objectives Subcommittee (CIOS). This provided the information on targets for the T-Forces that went in and targeted scientific, military, and industrial installations (and their employees) for their know-how. Initial priorities were advanced technology, such as infrared, that could be used in the war against Japan; finding out what technology had been passed on to Japan; and finally to halt the research.

A project to halt the research was codenamed "Project Safehaven", and it was not initially targeted against the Soviet Union; rather the concern was that German scientists might emigrate and continue their research in countries such as Spain, Argentina or Egypt, all of which had sympathized with Nazi Germany. In order to avoid the complications involved with the emigration of German scientists, the CIOS was responsible for scouting and kidnapping high-profile individuals to block technological advancements in nations outside of the U.S.

Much U.S. effort was focused on Saxony and Thuringia, which by July 1, 1945, would become part of the Soviet Occupation zone. Many German research facilities and personnel had been evacuated to these states, particularly from the Berlin area. Fearing that the Soviet takeover would limit U.S. ability to exploit German scientific and technical expertise, and not wanting the Soviet Union to benefit from said expertise, the United States instigated an "evacuation operation" of scientific personnel from Saxony and Thuringia, issuing orders such as:

By 1947, this evacuation operation had netted an estimated 1,800 technicians and scientists, along with 3,700 family members. Those with special skills or knowledge were taken to detention and interrogation centers, such as at Adlerhorst, Germany or one code-named DUSTBIN (located first in Paris and then moved to Kransberg Castle outside Frankfurt) to be held and interrogated, in some cases for months.

A few of the scientists were gathered as a part of Operation Overcast, but most were transported to villages in the countryside where there were neither research facilities nor work; they were provided stipends and forced to report twice weekly to police headquarters to prevent them from leaving. The Joint Chiefs of Staff directive on research and teaching stated that technicians and scientists should be released "only after all interested agencies were satisfied that all desired intelligence information had been obtained from them".

On November 5, 1947, the Office of Military Government, United States (OMGUS), which had jurisdiction over the western part of occupied Germany, held a conference to consider the status of the evacuees, the monetary claims that the evacuees had filed against the United States, and the "possible violation by the U.S. of laws of war or Rules of Land Warfare". The OMGUS director of Intelligence Robert L. Walsh initiated a program to resettle the evacuees in the Third World, which the Germans referred to as General Walsh's  ("jungle program"); however, this program never matured. In 1948, the evacuees received settlements of 69.5 million Reichsmarks from the U.S., a settlement that soon became severely devalued during the currency reform that introduced the Deutsche Mark as the official currency of western Germany.

John Gimbel concludes that the United States held some of Germany's best minds for three years, therefore depriving the German recovery of their expertise.

Arrivals

In May 1945, the U.S. Navy "received in custody" Herbert A. Wagner, the inventor of the Hs 293 missile; for two years, he first worked at the Special Devices Center, at Castle Gould and at Hempstead House, Long Island, New York; in 1947, he moved to the Naval Air Station Point Mugu.

In August 1945, Colonel Holger Toftoy, head of the Rocket Branch of the Research and Development Division of the U.S. Army's Ordnance Corps, offered initial one-year contracts to the rocket scientists; 127 of them accepted. In September 1945, the first group of seven rocket scientists (aerospace engineers) arrived at Fort Strong, located on Long Island in Boston harbor: Wernher von Braun, Erich W. Neubert, Theodor A. Poppel, William August Schulze, Eberhard Rees, Wilhelm Jungert, and Walter Schwidetzky.

Beginning in late 1945, three rocket-scientist groups arrived in the United States for duty at Fort Bliss, Texas, and at White Sands Proving Grounds, New Mexico, as "War Department Special Employees".

In 1946, the United States Bureau of Mines employed seven German synthetic fuel scientists at a Fischer–Tropsch chemical plant in Louisiana, Missouri.

On June 1, 1949, the Chief of Ordnance of the United States Army designated Redstone Arsenal in Huntsville, Alabama, as the Ordnance Rocket Center, its facility for rocket research and development. On April 1, 1950, the Fort Bliss missile development operation—including von Braun and his team of over 130 Paperclip members—was transferred to Redstone Arsenal.

In early 1950, legal U.S. residency for some of the Project Paperclip specialists was effected through the U.S. consulate in Ciudad Juárez, Chihuahua, Mexico; thus, German scientists legally entered the United States from Latin America.

Between 1945 and 1952, the United States Air Force sponsored the largest number of Paperclip scientists, importing 260 men, of whom 36 returned to Germany and one (Walter Schreiber) reemigrated to Argentina.

Eighty-six aeronautical engineers were transferred to Wright Field, Ohio, where the United States had Luftwaffe aircraft and equipment captured under Operation Lusty (Luftwaffe Secret Technology).

The United States Army Signal Corps employed 24 specialists—including the physicists Georg Goubau, Gunter Guttwein, Georg Hass, Horst Kedesdy, and Kurt Lehovec; the physical chemists Rudolf Brill, and Eberhard Both; the geophysicist Helmut Weickmann; the optician Gerhard Schwesinger; and the engineers Eduard Gerber, Richard Guenther, and Hans Ziegler.

In 1959, 94 Operation Paperclip men went to the United States, including Friedwardt Winterberg and Friedrich Wigand.

Overall, through its operations to 1990, Operation Paperclip imported 1,600 men as part of the intellectual reparations owed to the US and the UK, valued at $10 billion in patents and industrial processes.

Major awards (in the United States)
The NASA Distinguished Service Medal is the highest award which may be bestowed by the National Aeronautics and Space Administration (NASA). After more than two decades of service and leadership in NASA, four Nazi members from Operation Paperclip were awarded the NASA Distinguished Service Medal in 1969: Kurt Debus, Eberhard Rees, Arthur Rudolph, and Wernher von Braun. Ernst Geissler was awarded the medal in 1973.

The Department of Defense Distinguished Civilian Service Award is the highest civilian award given by the United States Department of Defense. After two decades of service, Nazi member from Operation Paperclip Siegfried Knemeyer was awarded the Department of Defense Distinguished Civilian Service Award in 1966.

The Goddard Astronautics Award is the highest honor bestowed for notable achievements in the field of astronautics by the American Institute of Aeronautics and Astronautics (AIAA). For their service, three Operation Paperclip members were awarded the Goddard Astronautics Award: Wernher von Braun (1961), Hans von Ohain (1966), and Krafft Arnold Ehricke (1984).

The U.S. Space & Rocket Center in Huntsville, Alabama, owns and operates the U.S. Space Camp. Several Operation Paperclip members are members of the Space Camp Hall of Fame (which began in 2007): Wernher von Braun (2007), Georg von Tiesenhausen (2007), and Oscar Holderer (2008).

The New Mexico Museum of Space History includes the International Space Hall of Fame. Two Operation Paperclip members are members of the International Space Hall of Fame: Wernher von Braun (1976) and Ernst Steinhoff (1979). Hubertus Strughold was inducted in 1978 but removed as a member in 2006. Other closely related members include Willy Ley (1976), a German-American science writer, and Hermann Oberth (1976), a German scientist who advised von Braun's rocket team in the U.S. from 1955 to 1958.

Two lunar craters are named after Paperclip scientists: Debus after Kurt Debus, the first director of NASA's Kennedy Space Center, and von Braun.

Scientific accomplishments
Wernher von Braun was chief architect of the Saturn V launch vehicle, which enabled human missions to the moon.

Adolf Busemann was responsible for the swept wing, which improved aircraft performance at high speeds.

Controversy and investigations
Before his official approval of the program, President Truman, for sixteen months, was indecisive on the program. Years later in 1963, Truman recalled that he was not in the least reluctant to approve Paperclip; that because of relations with the Soviet Union "this had to be done and was done".

Several of the Paperclip scientists were later investigated because of their links with the Nazi Party during the war. Only one Paperclip scientist, Georg Rickhey, was formally tried for any crime, and no Paperclip scientist was found guilty of any crime, in the United States or Germany. Rickhey was returned to Germany in 1947 to stand at the Dora Trial, where he was acquitted.

In 1951, weeks after his U.S. arrival, Walter Schreiber was linked by the Boston Globe to human experiments conducted by Kurt Blome at Ravensbrück, and he emigrated to Argentina with the aid of the U.S. military.

In 1984, Arthur Rudolph, under perceived threat of prosecution relating to his connection – as operations director for V-2 missile production – to the use of forced labor from Mittelbau-Dora at the Mittelwerk, renounced his U.S. citizenship and moved to West Germany, which granted him citizenship.

For 50 years, from 1963 to 2013, the Strughold Award – named after Hubertus Strughold, The Father of Space Medicine, for his central role in developing innovations like the space suit and space life support systems – was the most prestigious award from the Space Medicine Association, a member organization of the Aerospace Medical Association. On October 1, 2013, in the aftermath of a Wall Street Journal article published on December 1, 2012, which highlighted his connection to human experiments during WWII, the Space Medicine Association's Executive Committee announced that the Space Medicine Association Strughold Award had been retired.

Key recruits
 Advisors brought into the United States
 Hermann Oberth

Aeronautics and rocketry

 Hans Amtmann 
 Herbert Axster
 Erich Ball
 Oscar Bauschinger
 Hermann Beduerftig
 Rudi Beichel 
 Anton Beier 
 Herbert Bergeler
 Magnus von Braun
 Wernher von Braun
 Ernst Czerlinsky
 
 Walter Burose 
 Adolf Busemann
 GN Constan
 Werner Dahm
 Konrad Dannenberg
 Kurt H. Debus
 Gerd De Beek
 Walter Dornberger - head of rocket programme
 Gerhard Drawe
 Friedrich Duerr
 Ernst R. G. Eckert
 Rudolph Edse
 Otto Eisenhardt
 Krafft Arnold Ehricke
 Alfred Finzel
 Edward Fischel
 Karl Fleischer
 Anton Flettner 
 Anselm Franz
 Herbert Fuhrmann
 Ernst Geissler
 Werner Gengelbach
 Dieter Grau
 Hans Gruene
 Herbert Guendel
 Fritz Haber
 Heinz Haber
 Karl Hager
 Guenther Haukohl
 Karl Heimburg
 Emil Hellebrand
 Gerhard B. Heller
 Bruno Helm
 Rudolf Hermann
 Bruno Heusinger
 Hans Heuter
 Guenther Hintze
 Sighard F. Hoerner
 Kurt Hohenemser
 Oscar Holderer
 Helmut Horn 
 
 Dieter Huzel
 Walter Jacobi
 Erich Kaschig
 Ernst Klauss
 Theodore Knacke
 Siegfried Knemeyer
 Heinz-Hermann Koelle
 Gustav Kroll
 Willi Kuberg
 Werner Kuers
 Hermann Kurzweg
 Hermann Lange
 Hans Lindenberg
 Hans Lindenmayer 
 Alexander Martin Lippisch - aeronautical engineer
 Robert Lusser
 Hans Maus 
 Helmut Merk 
 Joseph Michel
 Hans Milde
 Heinz Millinger
 Rudolf Minning
 William Mrazek
 Hans Multhopp
 Erich Neubert
 Hans von Ohain (designer of German jet engines)
 Robert Paetz
 Hans Palaoro
 Kurt Patt 
 Hans Paul 
 Fritz Pauli
 Arnold Peter
 Helmuth Pfaff
 Theodor Poppel
Georg Rickhey
 Werner Rosinski
 Heinrich Rothe
 Ludwig Roth
 Arthur Rudolph
 
 Edgar Schaeffer
 Martin Schilling
 Helmut Schlitt
 Albert Schuler
 August Schulze
 Walter Schwidetzky
 Ernst Steinhoff
 Wolfgang Steurer
 Heinrich Struck
 Ernst Stuhlinger
 Bernhard Tessmann
 Adolf Thiel
 Georg von Tiesenhausen
 Werner Tiller
 JG Tschinkel
 Arthur Urbanski
 Fritz Vandersee
 Richard Vogt
 Woldemar Voigt (designer of Messerschmitt P.1101)
 Werner Voss
 Theodor Vowe
 Herbert A. Wagner
 Hermann Rudolf Wagner
 Hermann Weidner
 Walter Fritz Wiesemann
 Philipp Wolfgang Zettler-Seidel.

(see List of German rocket scientists in the US).

Architecture
 Heinz Hilten and Hannes Luehrsen.

Electronics - including guidance systems, radar and satellites

  
 
 Josef Boehm 
 Hans Fichtner
 Hans Friedrich
 Eduard Gerber
 Georg Goubau
 Walter Haeussermann
 Otto Heinrich Hirschler
 Otto Hoberg
 Rudolf Hoelker
 Hans Hollmann
 Helmut Hölzer
 Horst Kedesdy
 Kurt Lehovec
 Kurt Lindner
 JW Muehlner
 Fritz Mueller
 Johannes Plendl
 Fritz Karl Preikschat
 Eberhard Rees
 Gerhard Reisig
 Harry Ruppe 
 Heinz Schlicke
 Werner Sieber
 Othmar Stuetzer
 Albin Wittmann
 Hugo Woerdemann
 Albert Zeiler
 Hans K. Ziegler

Material Science (high temperature)
 Klaus Scheufelen  and Rudolf Schlidt.

Medicine – including biological weapons, chemical weapons, and space medicine
 , Kurt Blome, Rudolf Brill, Konrad Johannes Karl Büttner, Fritz Laves, Richard Lindenberg, Walter Schreiber, Hubertus Strughold, Hans Georg Clamann, and Erich Traub.

Physics
 Gunter Guttein, Gerhard Schwesinger, Gottfried Wehner, Helmut Weickmann, and Friedwardt Winterberg.

Chemistry and Chemical engineering
 Helmut Pichler, Leonard Alberts, Ernst Donath, Josef Guymer, Hans Schappert, Max Josenhaus, Kurt Bretschneider, Erich Frese

Similar operations
APPLEPIE: Project to capture and interrogate key Wehrmacht, RSHA AMT VI, and General Staff officers knowledgeable of the industry and economy of the USSR.
DUSTBIN (counterpart of ASHCAN): An Anglo-American military intelligence operation established first in Paris, then in Kransberg Castle, at Frankfurt.
ECLIPSE (1944): An unimplemented Air Disarmament Wing plan for post-war operations in Europe for destroying V-1 and V-2 missiles.
Safehaven: US project within ECLIPSE meant to prevent the escape of Nazi scientists from Allied-occupied Germany.
Field Information Agency, Technical (FIAT): US Army agency for securing the "major, and perhaps only, material reward of victory, namely, the advancement of science and the improvement of production and standards of living in the United Nations, by proper exploitation of German methods in these fields"; FIAT ended in 1947, when Operation Paperclip began functioning.
On April 26, 1946, the Joint Chiefs of Staff issued directive JCS 1067/14 to General Eisenhower instructing that he "preserve from destruction and take under your control records, plans, books, documents, papers, files and scientific, industrial and other information and data belonging to ... German organizations engaged in military research"; and that, excepting war-criminals, German scientists be detained for intelligence purposes as required.
National Interest/Project 63: Job placement assistance for Nazi engineers at Lockheed, Martin Marietta, North American Aviation, and other aeroplane companies, whilst American aerospace engineers were being laid off work.
Alsos Mission, Operation Big, Operation Epsilon, Russian Alsos: American, British and Soviet efforts to capture German nuclear secrets, equipment, and personnel.
Operation Backfire: A British effort at recovering rocket and aerospace technology, followed by assembling and testing rockets at Cuxhaven.
Fedden Mission: British mission to gain technical intelligence concerning advanced German aircraft and their propulsion systems.
Operation Lusty: US efforts to capture German aeronautical equipment, technology, and personnel.
Operation Osoaviakhim (sometimes transliterated as "Operation Ossavakim"), a Soviet counterpart of Operation Paperclip, involving German technicians, managers, skilled workers and their respective families who were relocated to the USSR in October 1946.
Operation Surgeon: British operation for denying German aeronautical expertise to the USSR, and for exploiting German scientists in furthering British research.
Special Mission V-2: April–May 1945 US operation, by Maj. William Bromley, that recovered parts and equipment for 100 V-2 missiles from a Mittelwerk underground factory in Kohnstein within the Soviet zone. Major James P. Hamill co-ordinated the transport of the equipment on 341 railroad cars with the 144th Motor Vehicle Assembly Company, from Nordhausen to Erfurt, just before the Soviets arrived. (See also Operation Blossom, Project Hermes, and Operation Sandy)
TICOM: US project to exploit German cryptographers.

See also

Operation Osoaviakhim
American cover-up of Japanese war crimes
Brain drain
Carmel Offie
List of Axis personnel indicted for war crimes
Operation Bloodstone
Project MKNAOMI
Ratlines (World War II)
Unit 731 – Japanese human experimenters who were recruited for their biological weapons technology
Upper Atmosphere Research Panel
In fiction:
Dr. Strangelove – a 1964 movie where the title character was said to have been brought to the USA via Operation Paperclip.
Captain America: The Winter Soldier – a 2014 movie in which Arnim Zola was said to have been brought to the USA via Operation Paperclip, where he secretly reformed HYDRA within S.H.I.E.L.D.
Moonglow – a 2016 novel which features a subplot which is based on Operation Paperclip.
Indiana Jones and the Dial of Destiny – an upcoming 2023 film in which the main antagonist is a Nazi scientist working for the Apollo program in 1969. The title character is uneasy about Operation Paperclip thanks to his past clashes with the Nazis.
Hunters (2020 TV series), a 2020 Amazon Prime TV show depicting a fictionalized version of Operation Paperclip and after in the late 1970s, driving the plot of the show.

Notes

References

Yves Beon, Planet Dora. Westview Press, 1997. .
Giuseppe Ciampaglia: "Come ebbe effettivo inizio a Roma l'Operazione Paperclip". Roma 2005. In: Strenna dei Romanisti 2005. Edit. Roma Amor
Henry Stevens, Hitler's Suppressed and Still-Secret Weapons, Science and Technology. Adventures Unlimited Press, 2007. 
John Gimbel, "Science Technology and Reparations: Exploitation and Plunder in Postwar Germany" Stanford University Press, 1990 
Linda Hunt, Arthur Rudolph of Dora and NASA, Moment 4, 1987 (Yorkshire Campaign for Nuclear Disarmament)
Linda Hunt, Secret Agenda:The United States Government, Nazi Scientists, and Project Paperclip, 1945 to 1990. St Martin's Press – Thomas Dunne Books, 1991. 
Linda Hunt, U.S. Coverup of Nazi Scientists The Bulletin of the Atomic Scientists. April 1985.
Matthias Judt; Burghard Ciesla, Technology Transfer Out of Germany After 1945 Harwood Academic Publishers, 1996. 
Michael C. Carroll, Lab 257: The Disturbing Story of the Government's Secret Germ Laboratory. Harper Paperbacks, 2005. 
John Gimbel "U.S. Policy and German Scientists: The Early Cold War"], Political Science Quarterly, Volume 101, Number 3 (1986), pages 433–51
Clarence G., Lasby Project Paperclip: German Scientists and the Cold War Scribner (February 1975) 
Christopher Simpson, Blowback: America's Recruitment of Nazis and Its Effects on the Cold War (New York: Weidenfeld & Nicolson, 1988)
Wolfgang W. E. Samuel American Raiders: The Race to Capture the Luftwaffe's Secrets (University Press of Mississippi, 2004)
Koerner, Steven T. "Technology Transfer from Germany to Canada after 1945: A Study in Failure?". Comparative Technology Transfer and Society, Volume 2, Number 1, April 2004, pp. 99–124
John Farquharson "Governed or Exploited? The British Acquisition of German Technology, 1945–48" Journal of Contemporary History, Volume 32, Number 1 (January 1997), pp. 23–42
1995 Human Radiation Experiments Memorandum: Post-World War II Reccruitment of German Scientists – Project Paperclip
Employment of German scientists and technicians: denial policy UK National archives releases March 2006.

Dr. Wernher von Braun First Center Director, July 1, 1960 – Jan. 27, 1970. NASA Marshall Space Flight Center History Office. Retrieved December 31, 2017.

Further reading

Brian E. Crim. 2018. Our Germans: Project Paperclip and the National Security State. Johns Hopkins University Press.
Laney, Monique (2015). German Rocketeers in the Heart of Dixie: Making Sense of the Nazi Past during the Civil Rights Era. New Haven: Yale University Press.
Eric Lichtblau (2014). [http://www.hmhco.com/shop/books/The-Nazis-Next-Door/9780544577886 The Nazis Next Door: How America Became a Safe Haven for Hitler's Men.  Mariner Books. 
Simpson, Christopher (1988). Blowback: America's Recruitment of Nazis and Its Effects on the Cold War. New York: Weidenfeld & Nicolson. .

External links

In Cold War, U.S. Spy Agencies Used 1,000 Nazis. Eric Lichtblau for The New York Times. October 26, 2014.
The Nazis Next Door: Eric Lichtblau on how the CIA & FBI Secretly Sheltered Nazi War Criminals – video report by Democracy Now!, October 31, 2014

Operation Paperclip
Brain drain
Aftermath of World War II in the United States
Allied occupation of Germany
Cold War history of the United States
German-American history
Office of Strategic Services
Research and development in Nazi Germany
Science and technology during World War II
Science in Nazi Germany
United States intelligence operations
World War II operations and battles of Europe
Wernher von Braun
American secret government programs